The 1925–26 Challenge Cup was the 26th staging of rugby league's oldest knockout competition, the Challenge Cup.

First round

Second round

Quarterfinals

Semifinals

Final
Swinton beat Oldham 9-3 in the final played at Rochdale before a crowd of 27,000.

This was Swinton's second appearance in the final and their second Cup final win.  Their previous victory was in 1900.

References

Challenge Cup
Challenge Cup